The Völkish Ideology and the Roots of Nazism: The Early Writings of Arthur Moeller van den Bruck is a book by Paul Harrison Silfen. It was published in New York City by Exposition Press in 1973 as an 85-page hardcover.

Contents
Preface
Moeller van den Bruck's Early Writings
The Life of Arthur Moeller van den Bruck
Civilization vs. Culture
The Concept of the "Volk" 
History and Power 
Nature and the Concept of "Rootedness"
A German Church
Jews and Negroes in Moeller's Writings
Conclusion
Anti-Semitism of Russia
Notes
Bibliography
Index

Notes

1973 non-fiction books
History books about Nazi Germany
20th-century history books